West Driefontein was a South African gold mining company belonging to the Goldfields Group (now Sibanye Gold).

It lies approximately  outside Carletonville next to Blyvooruitsig and East Driefontein. It used to be the richest gold mine in the world before it was flooded by water.

References

Populated places in the Merafong City Local Municipality